Zając (archaic feminine: Zającowa, plural Zającowie) is one of the most common surnames in Poland and the third most popular in Lesser Poland. The English translation of this surname is "hare". The surname occasionally appears as Zajonc due to the Polish pronunciation of ą as "on", however, the vowel is usually rendered as "a" outside Poland, producing Zajac. The latter form may also come from Slovak, Sorbian, Serbo-Croatian, or Belarusian cognates.

Notable people with the surname include:
 Bogdan Zając (born 1972), Polish football defender
 Czesław Zając, Polish sport shooter
 Jack Zajac (born 1929), American artist
 Józef Zając, (1891–1963), Polish general
 Karol Zając (1913-1965), Polish alpine skier
 Marcin Zając (born 1975), Polish football midfielder
 Marek Zając (born 1973), Polish football defender
 Stanisław Zając (born 1949), Polish politician
 Travis Zajac (born 1985), Polish-Canadian hockey player
 Robert Zajonc (1923–2008), Polish-American social psychologist

See also
 
 Zając, Masovian Voivodeship (east-central Poland)
 Zajac (disambiguation)

References 

Polish-language surnames
Surnames from nicknames